"Freaks" is a song by American hip hop recording artist French Montana and features Nicki Minaj. It was released on February 14, 2013, as the second single from his debut studio album Excuse My French (2013). The song was produced by Rico Love and Earl & E from Division 1.

Background
On January 26, 2013, French Montana announced that his next single "Freaks" would be released within the next week, the song contains samples of the song "Freaks", which originally appeared on the debut album of rapper Lil Vicious, Destination Brooklyn. "Freaks" featuring Nicki Minaj was premiered on Hot 97 on February 13, 2013, and released to iTunes the next day.

Music video
On February 18, 2013, the music video was filmed for "Freaks". On March 7, 2013, the music video was released.

Remix
On April 25, 2013 the official remix was released featuring DJ Khaled, Mavado, Rick Ross, Wale and Nicki Minaj along with a new verse by French Montana.

Track listing
 Digital single

Charts

Weekly charts

Year-end charts

Certifications

Release history

References

2012 songs
2013 singles
French Montana songs
Nicki Minaj songs
Bad Boy Records singles
Interscope Records singles
Songs written by Nicki Minaj
Songs written by Rico Love
Song recordings produced by Rico Love
Songs written by Earl Hood
Songs written by French Montana
Songs written by Eric Goudy